Ksabi Moulouya is a small town and rural commune in Boulemane Province of the Fès-Meknès region of Morocco. At the time of the 2004 census, the commune had a total population of 10067 people living in 1759 households.

References

Populated places in Boulemane Province
Rural communes of Fès-Meknès